John Stephen Bunting (born July 15, 1950) is a former head American football coach at the University of North Carolina as well as a former National Football League (NFL) player.  He was inducted to the Greater Wilmington Sports Hall of Fame in 2016.

Playing career
Bunting grew up in Silver Spring, Maryland and graduated from Springbrook High School in 1968.  He was a starting linebacker for the University of North Carolina from 1969 to 1971 under Coach Bill Dooley.  In 1971, Bunting earned All-Atlantic Coast Conference honors and helped lead the Tar Heels to their first outright ACC title, in 1971.

He had an eleven-year NFL career as a linebacker with the Philadelphia Eagles from 1972 to 1982, and he played in Philadelphia's Super Bowl XV game against the Oakland Raiders. Bunting then played for the Philadelphia Stars of the United States Football League from 1983 to 1984.

Coaching career

After retiring as an NFL player, Bunting moved into the coaching ranks. He served as a defensive assistant for three NFL teams: Kansas City Chiefs, St. Louis Rams, and the New Orleans Saints.  As the Rams' co-defensive coordinator (along with Peter Giunta), he played a key role in leading that team to their victory in Super Bowl XXXIV. From 1988 to 1992, he served as head coach at Rowan University (known as Glassboro State during his first three seasons), compiling a 38-14-2 record.

In December 2000, UNC athletic director Dick Baddour decided to hire him as the school's head football coach, replacing the fired Carl Torbush.

In his first season, Bunting led the Tar Heels to an 8-5 record and a victory over Auburn in the 2001 Peach Bowl.  However, his teams since were highly inconsistent.  Bunting compiled an overall record of 27 wins and 45 losses over six seasons, and notched only two winning records in ACC play. Bunting did manage UNC's first victories over a team ranked in the top 10 of a major media poll in school history. In his first game as head coach, the Tar Heels beat nine-time defending ACC champion Florida State 41-9; the Seminoles were ranked sixth in the AP Poll at the time. After the 2003 season, a season in which the Tar Heels did not appear in a bowl game, Bunting was a coach in the final Blue-Gray All-Star Classic. In 2004, the Tar Heels defeated Miami 31-28 on a last-second field goal by Connor Barth; the Hurricanes were ranked fourth at the time in the AP poll.  On the other end of the spectrum, his 2005 team was routed 69-14 by Louisville, one of the worst losses in modern Tar Heel history.

During his final season (2006), his team had a record of 3-9, while averaging over 23 fewer points per game than their opponents.

Baddour fired Bunting on October 22, 2006, but allowed Bunting to finish out the season.  His last home victory on November 18, 2006, against North Carolina State University, broke a seven-game losing streak, and he was able to close out his career one week later with a 45-44 win over the Duke Blue Devils.

Since his split with North Carolina, Bunting has been working as a commentator and announcer for college football.

Personal life
Bunting is married to Dawn Bunting and he has two children from his first marriage. They live in Naples, Florida.

Head coaching record

References

1950 births
Living people
American football linebackers
Brown Bears football coaches
Kansas City Chiefs coaches
New Orleans Saints coaches
North Carolina Tar Heels football coaches
North Carolina Tar Heels football players
Philadelphia Eagles players
Philadelphia/Baltimore Stars players
Rowan Profs football coaches
St. Louis Rams coaches
People from Silver Spring, Maryland
Sportspeople from Portland, Maine
Coaches of American football from Maryland
Players of American football from Maryland